Cindy Pöschel (born 21 September 1989) is a German slalom canoeist who competed at the international level from 2006 to 2014.

She won a silver medal in the K1 team event at the 2013 ICF Canoe Slalom World Championships in Prague. She also won a gold medal in the same event at the 2012 European Canoe Slalom Championships in Augsburg.

World Cup individual podiums

References

German female canoeists
Living people
1989 births
Place of birth missing (living people)
Medalists at the ICF Canoe Slalom World Championships